The  in Shiribeshi, on the west coast of Hokkaidō, Japan, is a mountainous peninsula which projects some  into the Sea of Japan. The Shakotan Peninsula forms part of the Niseko-Shakotan-Otaru Kaigan Quasi-National Park.

Geography 

The peninsula has a rugged terrain with few level areas. The coastline of the peninsula suffers from extensive marine erosion, which resulted in the numerous natural stone pillars which project from the sea. Mount Shakotan forms the highest peak on the peninsula. The peninsula has numerous scenic capes and inlets, notably Cape Shakotan and Cape Kamui.

Municipalities 

The Shakotan Peninsula spans seven municipalities in Hokkaidō, all within Shiribeshi Subprefecture.

 Iwanai（East entrance）
 Kyōwa
 Tomari
 Kamoenai
 Shakotan
 Furubira
 Yoichi（West entrance）

Economy 

The area was once a thriving center of Pacific herring fishing, which was conducted from the villages of Furubira, Iwanai, and Yoichi.

See also
; the Northwest point.

References

External links

Tourist attractions in Hokkaido
Peninsulas of Japan
Landforms of Hokkaido